Patruni Sastry, popularly known as Patruni Chidananda Sastry or Suffocated art Specimen is a Expressionist dancer, performance artist, visual artist, model and drag queen.

Biography
Sastry started dancing at the age of 5.  He was inspired by Ramya Krishnan from Padayappa in his initial days. Later from the Expressionist movement. He later learned Kuchipudi, Bharatanatyam, Odissi, Butoh, Contemporary dance. Sastry was inspired from Daniel Lismore, Austin Young and started performing Tranimal drag. Sastry performed at Hyderabad Literature festival, Namma Pride, The Lalit Ashok, Lamakaan. Shilparamam, and in many other public spaces. He  founded Dragvanti and also acted in a short film 'Polar Night' which is based on the Polar Night effect by Rakesh Asileti. In 2021, Sastry was the convener for India's first Drag Conference. Sastry uses dance to talk about social topics such as sex education, queer activism  and women empowerment.

Performance Style
Patruni self termed the dance as "Indian Expressionism", Inspired from Expressionist Dance with indian classical dance vocabulary. Explaining about the art from Patruni Said "This woman is so raged that she got rejected, she screams out loud and dances. So for the very first time as a kid, when I saw this, I thought if you have to show your anger, you have to dance…And since then, I kind of picked [it] up. Whenever my mom was not giving me a chocolate or whenever I was not getting what I wanted, I used to scream aloud and dance, That was, how it became a kind of an expression.” Patruni also blends the idea of performance art in every presentation. His performance are majorly centered towards body and how its centered with society, agency, and politics. Talking about performance art Patruni says "“I always [saw] my body as a kind of canvas,” Sastry says. “Literally using the body as a part of a movement—a movement is a canvas…When I pose a certain way or when I’m just posing in a different way—escalating my body into a certain form—it automatically creates a canvas. It automatically creates an art.”

Patruni's  Style of Drag is an Indian inspiration of Tranimal Drag. Patruni explains tranimal drag as "I always [saw] my body as a kind of canvas,”  Sastry says. "But, unlike traditional drag, in which performers are praised for their elegance and beauty, I was attracted to tranimal style–also called “drag terrorism”. Tranimal drag is the drag of poor, available drag queens. It does not throw money on clothes and cosmetics, and works on only one belief: “this will do”. Tranimal drag performers make outfits themselves with available trash. They look vigorous, and they momentarily erase beauty and gender norms. When I perform tranimal I am liberated, I become the drag queen who doesn’t wear heels, but performs bare-footed for the less privileged community that I try to remind myself of."

Activism
In 2018, a Telugu YouTube channel created more than a couple of videos which were homophobic, transphobic and gender phobic, to which Patruni confronted with a petition to take the channel down. Patruni has also shared opinions of legalization of same sex marriages, gay locker room and the Snapchat new gender swap filter which seemed like a mockery of trans and gender nonbinary identities. In the same year Patruni also  As a response to the Indian government stands on queer marriage rights Patruni said "I cannot believe that people who are involved in making polices are being this irrational about the basic gender rights of a human being. We expect our fellow citizens to stand with us in this as it’s a threat to the existence of entire community". In 2020, Patruni also raised his voice against transphobic episode telecasted on a popular reality show Big Boss Telugu.

Patruni has voiced out for Indian Bisexual and Pansexual rights in multiple occasions. In 2021, Patruni welcomed the DC's Bisexual Superman initiatives with open heart by saying "The whole Superman thing made me feel empowered after a long time. He came out as a bisexual which is not so usual. People usually come out as gay or a trans person. When a protagonist like Superman reveals his sexual identity, it triggers a conversation about gender diversity and inclusion". In the same year Patruni has condemned a cover photo of Ayushmann Khurrana on GQ (Indian edition) which called itself to be representing the gender fluidity. calling the act a huge problem Patruni said "People need to understand that gender fluidity is not about costume play. Wearing a ghaghra or putting a nail paint from a cis-het privilege doesn’t make someone gender fluid. Such things are quite insulting and disqualifying to the actual lives of people who are gender fluid. It leads to a lot of trauma and disqualification of a person’s existence." Patruni also worked created multiple telugu language folk songs to educate people on LGBTQIA+ issues.

In the Same year Patruni Organized Hyderabad's first ever BI/PAN fest celebrating the most under-represented identities of the queer community.

In 2022, Patruni spoke about Ram Gopal Verma's Lesbian-based movie "Dangerous", he said “Even if it is released in PVR and multiplexes, who is benefiting-RGV or the community? Is it message-oriented like Badhai Do or Chandigarh Kare Aashiqui? In a media interaction, he wanted to discuss only lesbian and not gay-related issues. If he donates half of his earnings to the community, then yes we can support him,". Patruni has also revolted for Gangubai Kathiawadi, speaking about the representation on Trans character by Vijay Raaz , In a Twitter post, Patruni said "Yet another shameless robbery of trans role. The only roles trans people get is to play are like this one and when some cis person plays a trans role, they take away the only opportunity"

Patruni hosted a podcast named Rangula Rattnam in 2022 that features members of the queer community discussing their lives and journeys in Telugu, making it possibly the first Telugu podcast to be hosted by a queer person.

Personal life
In 2018, Patruni came out as a Gender Fluid person. In the same year Sastry identified himself as a pansexual. In one of the interviews he also said that he is in relationship with a cis gender woman and is planning to marry her soon. In 2021, Patruni redefined themselves as pomosexual person. and Non-binary gender. On August 18, 2021, Patruni married Raja Rajeswari devi in Hindu rituals.

In 2022, Humans of Bombay, a social media platform covered a feature of Patruni and Rajeswari together which went viral on social media. In which Patruni said "My wife encourages me to be myself!". The video went viral with more than 2.5 million people viewership. In the same year, talking in an interview Patruni said "When I was looking to get married, there were so many people who said that I’d have to put aside my sexual identity. Others said it would mean I was cheating on my partner and many such ignorant things. Some even thought marriage would mean the end of my drag career. But, I’m grateful to have a wife like Rajeswari. She never questions anything I do. She gives me the warmth and love which I never got for ages".

Music

Folk songs
Pride Masam Anna 
Cheeranjiva Sukhibhava 
Chudu Sexy Gurl 
Rangula Rangamma 
Bisexual Ravanamma

Music videos

Publications 

  "Dressing as a Goddess: A Drag Photo book" (2020)
"My Experiments with Drag"(2020)

Selected live performances 

2014,2019: Queer And Allie Film and Art Festival
2017: International Story Telling Festival
2018, 2019: Hyderabad Literature Festival
2019: Out and Loud Film festival,Pune
2018:Menstrual Festival, Hyderabad
2018, 2019: Paryatan Parva, Hyderabad
2019: Ugadi Utsavalu, Hyderabad
2019,2020: Queer Carnival Hyderabad
2020, 2021: Queer Fiesta Hyderabad
2021: Hyderabad Dance Festival
2021: Samaanta by ICCR

Performance Art

2019: Four Play
2019: Strip Tease
2019: Patra
2019: Mati 
2019:What's My Colour
2019: Nirod
2020:69
2021: Coronasura

Film Appearances 

 Polar Night (as actor)
 Shoonyam (as director)
 70/100 (as editor)

References

External links
 Unboxing Gender | Chidananda Sastry Patruni | TEDxMLRIT
 Dance with Data | Patruni Chidananda Sastry | TEDxIBABangalore
 Etimes
 Radio Interview 
 Podcast Interview 

Living people
1992 births
Indian drag queens
Indian dancers
Indian LGBT artists
Non-binary drag performers
Non-binary models
LGBT dancers
Pansexual non-binary people
Genderfluid people